Ute Müller-Doblies is a German botanist with an interest in the systematics of Amaryllidaceae. She is currently at the Herbarium of the Technische Universität Berlin in collaboration with Dietrich Müller-Doblies (D.Müll.-Doblies.).

Selected publications

References

Bibliography  

1938 births
German taxonomists
Living people